Burt is a male first name.

Burt may also refer to:

Surname
Burt (surname)

Places
United States
Burt, Iowa, a city
Burt, Michigan, a census-designated place
Burt, New York, an unincorporated hamlet
Burt, North Dakota, an unincorporated community
Burt County, Nebraska
Burt Township, Alger County, Michigan
Burt Township, Cheboygan County, Michigan
Burt Lake, Michigan

Elsewhere
Burt, County Donegal, Ireland, a parish
Burt Castle, Ireland
Burt Island, Warwick, Bermuda
Fort Burt, a colonial fort in the British Virgin Islands
Division of Burt, an Australian federal electorate in Western Australia
Burt Rocks, Oates Land, Antarctica
6078 Burt, an asteroid

See also
Bert (disambiguation)
Birt (disambiguation)